The women's shot put event at the 1990 Commonwealth Games was held on 29 January at the Mount Smart Stadium in Auckland.

Results

References

Shot
1990
1990 in women's athletics